The Trough, formerly known as Taste of Crime, is a 2018 Hong Kong neo-noir crime thriller film written and directed by Nick Cheung, who also stars alongside Xu Jinglei, He Jiong and Yu Nan.

Plot
Undercover police officer Yu Chau (Nick Cheung) has successfully apprehended many criminals in the city of full of evil. Because a child abduction case, Yu's identity is starting to be brought to light, attracting the hunt from criminal groups. In order to adhere to justice within his heart, Yu does not hesitate to risk his life to start a life and death battle of wits against the leader of the mysterious criminal group.

Cast
Nick Cheung as Yu Chau (于秋)
Xu Jinglei as The Boss (宫田惠美子)
Keira Wang plays The Boss as a child.
He Jiong as Jim 
Yu Nan as Jackie (special appearance)
Michael Miu as Ching Wan (程昀; special appearance)
Yuen Wah as Chun Wah (春華; special appearance)
Maggie Cheung Ho-yee as Diane Cheung (張書文; special appearance)
Lam Suet as Nine Lame Fingers (九指跛)
Louis Cheung as Jeejah
Li Haitao as Zhong (阿仲忠)
Zaha Fathima as The girl
Chris Collins as Frankie
Paul Chun as Chief Lee (李局長; guest appearance)
Ni Dahong as Mr. Ren (任先生; guest appearance)
Philip Ng as Leader of the security guards (guest appearance)

Production
Production for The Trough began in January 2017. Filming took place in Shanghai, Japan and Thailand before wrapping up on 9 May 2017 in Shanghai.

Release
The film's first teaser trailer was released on 11 March 2017 which was also presented at the 2017 Hong Kong FILMART. The film was theatrically released in Hong Kong on 3 May 2018.

Box office
The Trough was a box-office bomb, grossing only US$6,061,514 worldwide against a budget of US$22 million.

In Hong Kong, the film grossed a total of HK$4,716,276 during its theatrical run from 3 May to 6 June 2018.

In China, the film grossed a total of CN¥34,909,000 at the box office.

References

External links
 
Taste of Crime - One Cool Film
低壓槽 The Trough on Facebook

2018 films
2018 crime thriller films
Hong Kong crime thriller films
Hong Kong neo-noir films
Chinese detective films
Hong Kong detective films
Police detective films
Dystopian films
Films set in Japan
Films set in Thailand
Films set in Namibia
Films shot in Shanghai
Films shot in Japan
Films shot in Thailand
Films directed by Nick Cheung
2010s Hong Kong films